Puri Jagannath may refer to:

 Jagannath Temple, Puri, a Hindu temple in Puri, Odisha, India
 Puri Jagannadh (born 1966), Indian filmmaker, mainly in Telugu cinema